Kabamba Tumba Kalabatama (born 27 January 2002) is a Zambian footballer who plays as a forward for Moss.

Career
Kalabatama was born in Lusaka, Zambia, to Congolese parents. At the age of 5 his family moved to Norway. He made his senior debut for Bjørnevatn at the age of 12 on 25 June 2014. This resulted in him being banned from senior football until he reached 15, because he was too young. In February 2020, he signed for Finnish Veikkausliiga side TPS. He returned to Norway in January 2022, signing a two-year contract with Moss.

Career statistics

Notes

References

2002 births
Living people
Zambian footballers
Association football forwards
Turun Palloseura footballers
Moss FK players
Norwegian Third Division players
Norwegian Fourth Division players
Ykkönen players
Norwegian Second Division players
Norwegian expatriate sportspeople in Finland
Expatriate footballers in Finland